Der goldene Pierrot (The Golden Pierrot) is an operetta in eight scenes by Walter Goetze to a libretto by Oskar Felix and Otto Kleinert. It premiered on 31 March 1934 at the Theater des Westens in Berlin.

Roles

Plot
Time and place: A large city by the Rhine, the present
It is the Karneval season, and the Council of Eleven, especially its chairman Peter Sander, is a bit perturbed by the regular appearance at every masquerade ball by a rather entertaining young female in the mask of a golden pierrot. No one, least of all the strict Sander, suspects his daughter Edith.

So far, Pierrot managed to avoid being unmasked, although it sometimes takes considerable wit. And so it is again today, when being cornered, she seeks help from a perfect stranger and pretends to be his wife. During the following conversation she learns that the man is in fact Horst Brenkendorf who her father has selected as her future husband. Horst is enchanted by this cheery female in the Pierrot mask, and confides to her that his future bride has been described to him as rather humdrum and plain. They promise to see each other again.

The next day Horst pays a visit to Peter Sander, and Edith, whom Horst fails to recognize, plays the role of the rather dull maiden. Disappointed by his future bride, he is even more captivated by Pierrot when they meet again at a ball that evening.

Six months later Horst and Edith marry. On the wedding day, he surprisingly receives a billet-doux from Pierrot, inviting him to the tryst they promised each other at the ball. Horst is reluctant to go, but when he recognizes Pierrot's true identity from the ring she wears, he decides to go. Edith is bitterly disappointed by her husband's apparent willingness to cheat on her on her wedding day and breaks out in tears. Horst then ends the cruel play and reveals that he has seen through her disguise - echoes of Susanna and Figaro in act IV.

Notable arias
Goldener Pierrot, eine Nacht mit dir
Viel schöne Frauen gibt's im bunten Liebesgarten
Wer am Rosenmontag an Aschermittwoch denkt (duet)
Sei pünktlich, und lass mich nicht warten
Man spielt nicht mit Herzen
Tanzen will jedes Mädel
Die Welt ist schön und muss sich drehn (Grit)
Den ersten Walzer hat erdacht der Mann im Mond

References

Reclams Operettenführer, Anton Würz (ed.), Stuttgart 1962

1934 operas
German-language operettas
Operas by Walter Goetze
Operas